Congenital amegakaryocytic thrombocytopenia (CAMT) is a rare inherited disorder.

Presentation
The primary manifestations are thrombocytopenia and megakaryocytopenia, or low numbers of platelets and megakaryocytes. There is an absence of megakaryocytes in the bone marrow with no associated physical abnormalities.

Cause
The cause for this disorder appears to be a mutation in the gene for the TPO receptor, c-mpl, despite high levels of serum TPO. In addition, there may be abnormalities with the central nervous system including the cerebrum and cerebellum which could cause symptoms.

Diagnosis

Treatment
The primary treatment for CAMT is bone marrow transplantation.

Bone Marrow/Stem Cell Transplant is the only thing that ultimately cures this genetic disease. Frequent platelet transfusions are required to ensure that platelet levels do not fall to dangerous levels, although this is not always the case. It is known for patients to continue to create very small numbers of platelets over time.

See also
 Thrombopoietin
 Myeloproliferative leukemia virus oncogene

References

External links 
 Amegakaryocytic Thrombocytopenia research study of Inherited Bone Marrow Failure Syndromes (IBMFS) 

Coagulopathies
Cell surface receptor deficiencies